Nick Scott (born 13 June 1990) is an English rugby union player who plays for Richmond regional team as a winger.

Scott made his debut for the Newport Gwent Dragons regional team in 2015 having previously played for Bath Rugby, London Welsh, Newbury RFC and London Scottish.

References

External links 
Newport Gwent Dragons Player Profile

1990 births
Living people
Rugby union players from Hereford
English rugby union players
Dragons RFC players
Rugby union wings